Lara Gut-Behrami (born 27 April 1991) is a Swiss World Cup alpine ski racer who competes in all disciplines and specializes in the speed events of downhill and Super-G. She won the gold medal in the Super-G event at the 2022 Winter Olympics in Beijing.

Career

Gut was born in Sorengo, Canton Ticino; her father, Pauli Gut, is Swiss from Airolo, and her mother, Gabriella Almici, a masseuse, was born in Zone, Lombardy. Gut participated in her first FIS races at age 15 in December 2006. At the Alpine Youth World Championship 2007 at Altenmarkt, Austria, she won silver in downhill. In the same year, she became the Swiss national champion in super-G, the second youngest champion of all time. In the 2007 season, Gut finished second in the downhill standings of the Europa Cup.

In late December 2007, Gut made her World Cup debut in a giant slalom at Lienz, Austria. In January 2008, at Caspoggio, she won four consecutive Europa Cup races. At her first World Cup downhill race on 2 February 2008, Gut made the podium in third place at St. Moritz, despite falling on the finishing pitch and sliding on her back through the finish line, she finished only 0.35 seconds behind the winner. She followed her World Cup speed debut with a fifth-place finish in the super-G the next day.  Following the 2008 season, Gut was moved up to the World Cup team for the 2009 season.

Early in her first full season, Gut won her first World Cup race on 20 December 2008, a super-G in St. Moritz, finishing 0.63 seconds ahead of runner-up Fabienne Suter.
Gut became the youngest skier to win a World Cup super-G race at 17.65 years (17 years, 237 days).

At the 2009 World Championships at Val-d'Isère, France, Gut won silver medals in the downhill and the super combined, more than two months before her 18th birthday.

On 29 September 2009, Gut fell during training at Saas-Fee, Switzerland, and dislocated her hip.  She was transported by helicopter to a hospital in Visp, where it was reset. The Swiss Ski Federation initially reported that Gut would be out of competition for at least a month. In January 2010, it was announced that Gut would miss the 2010 Olympic Games in Vancouver because of a slow recovery from a hip injury.
She sat out the entire 2010 season but returned for the 2011 season and earned four podiums, which included a victory in the super-G at Altenmarkt-Zauchensee in January.

Gut switched ski suppliers following the 2011 season, leaving Atomic for a three-year deal with Rossignol. Though she had seven top-ten finishes in three disciplines during the 2012 World Cup season, she did not reach a podium; her best results were three top-five finishes.

In December 2012, Gut won her first World Cup downhill in Val-d'Isère, France. She finished ahead of American Leanne Smith (0.16 sec) and fellow Swiss skier Nadja Kamer (0.5 sec).

Gut won her first Olympic medal in the downhill in 2014 at Sochi. She took the bronze, finishing 0.10 seconds behind Tina Maze and fellow Swiss skier Dominique Gisin, who both won the gold. In World Cup, she won the Super-G season title and finished third overall in 2014.

After four years with Rossignol, Gut changed to Head equipment in May 2015.

At the World Championships in 2017 on home country snow in St. Moritz, Gut won bronze in the super-G. In the next event, the combined, she injured her left knee (ACL, meniscus) between runs, which ended her season.

In February 2020, Gut won her first race in over two years, the World Cup downhill in Crans-Montana, Switzerland.

In the 2020-2021 season, she had one of the most successful showings of her career thus far, winning four consecutive Super-G races on the World Cup while also entering a close battle for the overall lead with Petra Vlhová. She continued her successful season at the World Championships in Cortina D’Ampezzo. In the Super-G, she delivered on the promise displayed on the World Cup, winning her first world title and bronze in the downhill. With only a single giant slalom podium on the World Cup that season, she became somewhat of a surprise winner in the Giant Slalom, with reigning Olympic Champion Mikaela Shiffrin having two strong runs and many of the top performers from the World Cup displaying poor performances; however, Gut-Behrami still prevailed to win the Giant Slalom by .02 in what was the closest Giant Slalom in world championship history. She became the second Swiss woman to win two golds in a single championship and the first in 34 years following Erika Hess’ strong showing in 1987.

Personal life
Gut is fluent in Italian, German, French, and English and knows Spanish.

She married Swiss football player Valon Behrami in July 2018, and has since competed using the double-barrelled name Gut-Behrami.

World Cup results

Season titles
 5 titles – (1 overall, 4 super-G)

Season standings
{| class="wikitable" style="font-size:95%; text-align:center; border:grey solid 1px; border-collapse:collapse;" width="40%"
|- style="background-color:#369; color:white;"
|rowspan="2" colspan="1" width="6%"|Season
|- style="background-color:#4180be; color:white;"
| width="3%"|Age
| width="5%"|Overall
| width="5%"|Slalom
| width="5%"|GiantSlalom
| width="5%"|Super-G
| width="5%"|Downhill
| width="5%"|Combined
|- style="background-color:#8CB2D8; color:white;"
|-
| 2008 ||16|| 54 || — || — || 26 || 30 || —
|-
| 2009 ||17|| 11 || 45 || 9 || 11 || 12 || 16
|-
| 2010 ||18|| colspan=6| injured in September: out for entire season
|-
| 2011 ||19|| 10 || — || 28 || 4 || 7 || 30
|-
| 2012 ||20|| 14 || — || 17 || 8 || 18 || 30
|-
| 2013 ||21|| 9 || — || 6 || 10 || 5 || 4
|-
| 2014 ||22|| style="background:#c96;"|3 || — || 4 || style="background:gold;"|1 || 6 || 15
|-
| 2015 ||23|| 9 || — || 24 || 5 || 6 || —
|-
| 2016 ||24|| style="background:gold;"|1 || 43 || style="background:#c96;"|3 || style="background:gold;"|1 || 4 || style="background:silver;"|2
|-
| 2017 ||25|| 4 || 57 || 5 || style="background:#c96;"|3 || style="background:#c96;"|3 || —
|-
| 2018 ||26|| 12 || — || 23 || style="background:silver;"|2 || 10 || 24
|-
| 2019 ||27|| 21 || — || 26 || 7 || 18 ||—
|-
| 2020 ||28|| 7 || — || 14 || 4 || 4 ||—  
|-
| 2021 ||29|| style="background:silver;"|2|| — || 7 || style="background:gold;"|1 ||style="background:#c96;"|3|| rowspan="3"      
|-
| 2022 ||30||11|| — ||13||6||15     
|-
| 2023 ||31||style="background:silver;"|2|| —||style="background:silver;"|2|| style="background:gold;"|1||6    
|}

Race victories

World Championship results

 Injured between runs of Combined event in 2017

Olympic results

References

External links
 
 
 Lara Gut-Behrami at Swiss Ski Team ''
 

1991 births
Swiss female alpine skiers
Alpine skiers at the 2014 Winter Olympics
Alpine skiers at the 2018 Winter Olympics
Alpine skiers at the 2022 Winter Olympics
Olympic alpine skiers of Switzerland
Medalists at the 2014 Winter Olympics
Medalists at the 2022 Winter Olympics
Olympic medalists in alpine skiing
Olympic gold medalists for Switzerland
Olympic bronze medalists for Switzerland
Swiss people of Italian descent
People of Lombard descent
People from Sorengo
Living people
Sportspeople from Ticino
21st-century Swiss women
Association footballers' wives and girlfriends